A rail trail is a shared-use path on railway right of way. Rail trails are typically constructed after a railway has been abandoned and the track has been removed, but may also share the right of way with active railways, light rail, or streetcars (rails with trails), or with disused track. As shared-use paths, rail trails are primarily for non-motorized traffic including pedestrians, bicycles, horseback riders, skaters, and cross-country skiers, although snowmobiles and ATVs may be allowed. The characteristics of abandoned railways—gentle grades, well-engineered rights of way and structures (bridges and tunnels), and passage through historical areas—lend themselves to rail trails and account for their popularity. Many rail trails are long-distance trails, while some shorter rail trails are known as greenways or linear parks.

Rail trails around the world

Americas

Bermuda

The Bermuda Railway ceased to operate as such when the only carrier to exist in Bermuda folded in 1948. Some of the former right of way were converted for automobile traffic, and in 1984 18 miles were converted to a rail trail, reserved for pedestrian use and bicycles on paved portions. The rail bed spans the length of the island, and connected Hamilton to St. George's and several villages, though several bridges are derelict, causing the trail to be fragmented.

Canada

The Kettle Valley Rail Trail in British Columbia uses a rail corridor that was originally built for the now-abandoned Kettle Valley Railway.  The trail was developed during the 1990s after the Canadian Pacific Railway abandoned train service.

Protected as a linear park under the provincial park system, the T'Railway consists of the railbed of the historic Newfoundland Railway as transferred from its most recent owner, Canadian National Railway, to the provincial government after rail service was abandoned on the island of Newfoundland in 1988. The rail corridor stretches from Channel-Port aux Basques in the west to St. John's in the east with branches to Stephenville, Lewisporte, Bonavista, Placentia and Carbonear.

Following the abandonment of the Prince Edward Island Railway in 1989, the government of Prince Edward Island purchased the right-of-way to the entire railway system. The Confederation Trail was developed as a tip-to-tip walking/cycling gravel rail trail which doubles as a monitored and groomed snowmobile trail during the winter months, operated by the PEI Snowmobile Association.

In Quebec, Le P'tit Train du Nord runs  from Saint-Jérôme to Mont-Laurier.

In Toronto, there are two rail trails, the Beltline Trail and the West Toronto Railpath.

In central Ontario, the former Victoria Railway line, which runs  from the town of Lindsay, Ontario, north to the village of Haliburton, in Haliburton County, serves as a public recreation trail. It can be used for cross country skiing, walking, and snowmobiling in the winter months, and walking, cycling, and horse riding from spring to autumn. The majority of the rail trail passes through sparsely populated areas of the Canadian Shield, with historic trestle bridges crossing several rivers. 
 
The old Sarnia Bridge in St. Marys, Ontario, was re-purposed as part of the Grand Trunk Trail. The former Grand Trunk Railway viaduct was purchased from Canadian National Railway in 1995. In 2012, The re-purposing of the Sarnia Bridge was inducted into the North America Railway Hall of Fame.

A railroad between Gateway Road and Raleigh Street in Winnipeg, Manitoba, was turned into a  asphalt trail in 2007. It is called the Northeast Pioneers Greenway, and has plans for expansion into East St. Paul, and eventually to Birds Hill Park.

In Nova Scotia, almost every section of the Trans Canada Trail and other walking trails are abandoned railways. A small railway line from Musquodoboit Harbour (Musquodoboit Trailway) to Dartmouth are nearly fully used by community members and tourists. Another extremely large section is used from Halifax to New Germany to Yarmouth to Grand Pre.

A considerable part of the Trans Canada Trail are repurposed defunct rail lines donated to provincial governments by CP and CN rail rebuilt as walking trails. The main section runs along the southern areas of Canada connecting most of Canada's major cities and most populous areas. There is also a long northern arm which runs through Alberta to Edmonton and then up through northern British Columbia to Yukon. The trail is multi-use and depending on the section may allow hikers, bicyclists, horseback riders, cross country skiers and snowmobilers.

United States

In North America, the decades-long consolidation of the rail industry led to the closure of a number of uneconomical branch lines and redundant mainlines. Some were maintained as short line railways, but many others were abandoned. The first abandoned rail corridor in the United States converted into a recreational trail was the Elroy-Sparta State Trail in Wisconsin, which opened in 1967. The following year the Illinois Prairie Path opened. The conversion of rails to trails hastened with the federal government passing legislation promoting the use of railbanking for abandoned railroad corridors in 1983 which was upheld by the U.S. Supreme Court in 1990. This process preserves rail corridors for possible future rail use with interim use as a trail. By the 1970s, even main lines were being sold or abandoned. This was especially true when regional rail lines merged and streamlined their operations. As both the supply of potential trails increased and awareness of the possibilities rose, state governments, municipalities, conservation authorities, and private organizations bought the rail corridors to create, expand or link green spaces.

The longest developed rail trail is currently the  Katy Trail in Missouri.

The Beltline, in Atlanta, Georgia, is currently under construction. In 2030, its anticipated year of completion, it will be one of the longest continuous trails. The Atlanta BeltLine is a sustainable redevelopment project that will provide a network of public parks, multi-use trails and transit along a historic 22-mile railroad corridor circling downtown and connecting many neighborhoods directly to each other.

The Rails-to-Trails Conservancy is a nationwide nonprofit group that advocates for rail trails and has many documents and advice on building a rail trail.  Per their records, the U.S. currently has 22,107 miles of rail trail complete.  , Michigan has the most total mileage (2,381) of any state.

Europe

Germany

Some of the longest rail trails are in the state of Rhineland-Palatinate. Up to date, the 23 km long Nordbahntrasse in Wuppertal is still the rail trail with the highest standard in Germany and is a prime example of conversion of an abandoned railway track into a multiuser cycling path.

United Kingdom

With almost 150 tracks in use, the United Kingdom has the second-largest network of rail trails in Europe after Germany. The development of rail trails in the United Kingdom grew after a major programme of railway line closures in the 1960s known as the Beeching cuts. Many rural and suburban lines were closed along with selected main line trunk routes. A  section (between Braunton and Meeth) of the Tarka Trail in Devon is one of the longest of these. 

Many of these former railway lines form part of the British National Cycle Network, connecting with long-distance paths and towpaths along Britain's extensive network of canals. For example, the Milton Keynes redway system runs throughout Milton Keynes in Buckinghamshire, England, in parts using the former trackbed of the defunct Wolverton to Newport Pagnell Line (closed 1962) and the Grand Union Canal towpath. Together, these paths form part of the long-distance National Cycle Network Route 6 and Route 51. Other urban and suburban rail trails include the Fallowfield Loop Line in Manchester, the Middlewood Way in Cheshire and the Ebury Way in Watford. Notable rural rail trails include the Dava Way, running along the route of the former Highland Railway between Grantown and Forres in the Scottish Highlands, and the High Peak Trail in the English Peak District. In London, a more unusual scheme has been proposed to convert some disused London Underground tunnels into subterranean rail trails under the city, but this scheme has not been officially approved.

Spain

With more than 2,500 kilometers of rail trails (Via Verde) in a network of 117 cycling and walking itineraries, Spain ranks high in the European greenways scene. The trails are managed or coordinated by the Spanish Railways Foundation, an institution created in 1985. Many of the converted tracks were originally built for the mining industry, connecting remote mountain sites with port locations on the coast, now offering picturesque rides from wild interior landscapes to the seaside.

Ireland

Cuts to Ireland's once expansive rail network in the mid 20th century left Ireland with a vast network of disused railways. While many lines were ripped up and the sections of the land acquired by private owners, a number of former railways do exist intact, thus providing the option for the development of many rail trails in the future.

The rail-trail on the former Westport to Achill Island line, known as the Great Western Greenway, was completed in 2011. Much progress has been made on the development of a rail-trail on the former Limerick to Tralee/Fenit line, in the form of the Great Southern Trail. As of 2013, a  section from Rathkeale to Abbeyfeale has been completed.

Planning permission has been granted to redevelop the former Galway to Clifden railway into a greenway, but negotiations are still underway with landowners regarding its routing. A section of the Waterford, Limerick and Western Railway railway line, from Claremorris to Collooney has been touted for redevelopment as a greenway, but has met with some recent opposition from groups wishing for reestablishment of the railway itself.

Belgium

The gradient is never more than six per cent, and the tracks are open to all forms of non-motorised travellers, including cyclists, horse-riders, hikers and even roller-bladers.

There is also the Vennbahn, which runs along an unusual border between Belgium and Germany.

Finland
Baana is an old cargo rail track in Helsinki converted into a pedestrian and bicycle trail.

Oceania

Australia

The development of rail trails in southeastern Australia can be traced to the gold rushes of the second half of the 19th century. Dozens of rail lines sprang up, aided by the overly enthusiastic "Octopus Act", but soon became unprofitable as the gold ran out, leading to a decreased demand for timber in turn. Decades later, these easements found a new use as tourist drawcards, once converted to rail trails. Dozens exist in some form, like the   Port Fairy to Warrnambool Rail Trail, but only a few — such as the  Murray to the Mountains Rail Trail — have been fully developed. Progress is frequently hampered by trestle bridges in unsafe condition, easements that have been sold off to farmers, and lack of funds. Funding is typically contributed in roughly equal parts from federal, state, and local governments, with voluntary labour and in kind donations contributed by local groups.
The latest addition to the Rail Trail scene in Victoria is The Great Victorian Rail Trail which is the longest rail trail in Victoria covering . It has become popular with tourists as it meanders through steep valleys and open farm country. The Rail Trails Australia website is a good source of local information. about trails in Australia.

New Zealand

A number of rail trails have been established through New Zealand; the best known are the Hauraki Rail Trail (linking Thames, Paeroa, Te Aroha and Waikino/Waihi), Otago Central Rail Trail and the Little River Rail Trail. The New Zealand Cycle Trail project, a Government-led initiative, will greatly accelerate the establishment of new trails. The first seven projects (not all of them rail trails, though) were announced in July 2009 and will receive NZ$9 million in funding of the total project budget of NZ$50 million.

Asia

Singapore 
On 24 May 2010, the Singapore and Malaysia governments agreed to move the Singapore terminus of the Keretapi Tanah Melayu Berhad (KTMB) from the Tanjong Pagar railway station in southern Singapore to Woodlands Train Checkpoint in northern Singapore. This resulted in the railway lines in Singapore becoming surplus as the Woodlands terminus is just over the border from Malaysia. Government agencies such as the Urban Redevelopment Authority (URA) and the Singapore Land Authority (SLA) have taken responsibility for developing and implementing ideas and activities for the former rail lands. The URA has a dedicated web site on Rail Corridor. An example of activities permitted include street art on a section of the disused railway, supported by the SLA, URA, Land Transport Authority and the National Arts Council.

There is also the Jurong spur line,  in length. The area occupied by the railways is at least , and up to  when the land around the Tanjong Pagar Railway Station and other nodes are included. Given the location of the railway lands in land scarce Singapore, there was concern that the lands would be developed. Organisations such as the Nature Society Singapore developed comprehensive plans to maintain the rail lands for nature-related pursuits. The Green Corridor web site is a campaign website dedicated to preserving its natural form.

Urban rail trail parks
In a number of cities disused rail tracks have been converted into linear parks. One example is the High Line (also known as "High Line Park"), a  elevated linear park created on an elevated section of a disused New York Central Railroad. Inspired by the  Promenade plantée (tree-lined walkway), a similar project in Paris completed in 1993, the High Line has been redesigned and planted as an aerial greenway and rails-to-trails park.

Conversion issues

Rail trail conversions can be complex for legal, social, and economic reasons. Railroads in North America were often built with a mix of purchased land, government land grants, and easements. The land deeds can be over a hundred years old, land grants might be conditional upon continuous operation of the line, and easements may have expired, all expensive and difficult issues to determine at law.

Railroad property rights have often been poorly defined and sporadically enforced, with neighboring property owners intentionally or accidentally using land they do not own. Such encroachers often later oppose a rail to trail conversion. Even residents who are not encroaching on railway lands may oppose conversion on the grounds of increased traffic in the area and the possibility of a decline in personal security. Because linear corridors of land are only valuable if they are intact, special laws regulate the abandonment of a railroad corridor. In the United States, the Surface Transportation Board (STB) regulates railroads, and can allow a corridor to be "rail banked" or placed on hold for possible conversion back to active status when or if future need demands.

While many rail trails have been built, other proposals have been cancelled by community opposition. The stature of the conversion organization, community involvement, and government willingness are key factors.

On the other hand, there are a growing number of cases where existing rails and infrastructure, in service or not, are being called to be torn up for trails. Two cases of this are in New York State, against the Catskill Mountain Railroad in Kingston, New York, and the Adirondack Scenic Railroad in Old Forge, New York. In Connecticut, the not-in-service section of track on the Valley Railroad has been proposed by locals to be converted to trail. Though perceived by residents to be, as it has not carried a train since the 1960s, the railroad has never been formally abandoned. The Connecticut Department of Energy and Environmental Protection acquired the line from Penn Central in 1969, and subsequently signed a long-term lease with the railroad. The railroad has been continually working to bring this section of the line back into service. Both Departments strongly support the preservation of the line, and have provided support to the railroad with property encroachment from abutters and the provision of railroad ties. All three of these examples are heritage railroads, which serve to protect the history of the railroad. Their primary revenue is tourist operations, so rail traffic is seasonal; though all three have been granted rights to carry freight, should customers show interest.

Trails to rails
Though rare, there are several cases in which trails convert back to active railroads. One example occurred in 2012 in Clarence, Pennsylvania, where the R.J. Corman Railroad Company received permission to rebuild  of railbanked line to serve new industries.

Typical features

Most original rail lines were surveyed for ease of transport and gentle (often less than 2%) grades.  Therefore, the rail trails that succeeded them are often fairly straight and ideally suited to overcome steep or awkward terrain such as hills, escarpments, rivers, swamps, etc.  Rail trails often share space with linear utilities such as pipelines, electrical transmission wires, and telephone lines.

Most purchase of railway land is dictated by the free market value of the land, so that land in urban and industrial cores is often impractical to purchase and convert.  Therefore, rail trails may end on the fringes of urban areas or near industrial areas and resume later, as discontinuous portions of the same rail line, separated by unaffordable or inappropriate land.

A railroad right-of-way (easement) width varies based on the terrain, with a  width being ample enough where little surface grading is required.  The initial  stretch of the Illinois Central Railroad is the most liberal in the world with a width of  along the whole length of the line. Rail trails are often graded and covered in gravel or crushed stone, although some are paved with asphalt and others are left as dirt.  Where rail bridges are incorporated into the trail, the only alterations (if any) tend to be adding solid walking areas on top of ties or trestles, though bridges in poorer condition do receive new guardrails, paint, and reinforcement.  If paved, they are especially suitable for people who use wheelchairs.

Where applicable, the same trails used in the summer for walking, jogging, and inline skating can be used in the winter for Nordic skiing, snowshoeing, and sometimes snowmobiling.

Rail with trail

As some railways have a service road alongside, these may be used as cycle tracks, but these are not 'rail trails' in the conventional sense.

See also 

 
 Cycleway
 Greenway (landscape)
 Outline of cycling
 List of rail trails
 Rails-to-Trails Conservancy (RTC)
 Rails with trails (along a working line)
 Segregated cycle facilities
 
 Marvin M. Brandt Revocable Trust v. United States
 EuroVelo, a network of long-distance cycling routes across Europe

Further reading

References

 
Cycling infrastructure
Road infrastructure